Jason Mills (born 12 August 1969) is a New Zealand former cricketer. He played 27 first-class and 30 List A matches for Auckland between 1991 and 1999.

See also
 List of Auckland representative cricketers

References

External links
 

1969 births
Living people
New Zealand cricketers
Auckland cricketers
Cricketers from Auckland